Villem Orav (11 March 1883, Laiksaare municipality - 10 December 1952, Tallinn) was an Estonian historian, teacher, and scholar of pedagogy.

In 1905 he graduated from Riga Theological Seminary, and in 1911–13 studied at the University of Warsaw, He was teacher from 1917 to 1949 at Gustav Adolf Grammar School history teacher and in 1952 became a Fellow of the Institute of History.

He published numerous pedagogical books, magazine reviews, and methodological articles, including "Eesti NSV ajaloo lugemiku I" (1960), "Psühholoogia õpperaamat pedagoogilistele koolidele" (1948), and "Ajaloo õpetamise metoodika seitsmeklassilises koolis" (1949).

References

1883 births
1952 deaths
People from Saarde Parish
People from Kreis Pernau
Eastern Orthodox Christians from Estonia
20th-century Estonian historians
Estonian schoolteachers
20th-century Estonian educators
University of Warsaw alumni